Valley Forge Flag, based in Wyomissing, Pennsylvania, is one of the largest U.S. flag manufacturers. The company was founded in 1882. It has a large wet printing facility in Olanta, South Carolina.

In June 2015, following the events of the Charleston church shooting, Valley Forge Flag announced that they would cease to sell Confederate flags.

References

External links 
 

1882 establishments in Pennsylvania
Companies based in Berks County, Pennsylvania
Companies based in South Carolina
Companies established in 1882
Flag manufacturers